Kunda is a village and gram panchayat in the Kunda CD block in the Chatra subdivision of  the Chatra district in the Indian state of Jharkhand.

History
Kunda fort was strongly fortified and located on a hill in the later medieval period. In 1660, Daud Khan, the Mughal governor of Bihar during the reign of Aurangzeb, occupied the fort and completely destroyed it. Later in the same century, a rebuilt Kunda fort came under the possession of Raja of Ramgarh. In 1734, Alivardi Khan conquered and destroyed it.

With the East India Company acquiring the diwani of Bengal, Bihar and Odisha in 1765, it derived the right to collect revenue from the estates of Ramgarh, Kharagdiha, Kendi and Kunda. In 1769, the area came in contact with the British when Captain Camac visited the area with the objective of establishing some sort of order in the “Jungleterry” region.  In 1771, Capt. Camac subdued the Rajas of Kharagdiha and Kunda. Although the Kol uprising of 1829-1839 did not seriously affect the area, its administrative structure was altered. The parganas of Ramgarh, Kharagdiha, Kendi and Kunda “became parts of the south-west frontier agency and formed into a division named Hazaribagh with Hazaribagh as the administrative headquarters.”

The ruins of old Kunda palace/ fort can still be seen in a dilapidated condition some 3–4 miles from the present Kunda village. The present structure was possibly built in the late 17th/ early 18th century. Of particular interest to tourists is an intriguing cave, half a mile from the old palace. Every year on 14th Phalguna/ Maha Shivaratri, there is a large gathering.

Geography

Location                                

Area overview
The map alongside shows that the forests (mark the light shading), covering around 60% of Chatra district, are evenly spread across the district. The map provides links to three CCL operational areas.

Note: The map alongside presents some of the notable locations in the district. All places marked in the map are linked in the larger full screen map.

Demographics
According to the 2011 Census of India, Kunda (location code 348474) had a total population of 2,989, of which 1,554 (52%) were males and 1,435 (48%) were females. Population in the age range 0–6 years was 626. The total number of literate persons in Kunda was 1,232 (52.14% of the population over 6 years).

Civic administration

Police station
Kunda police station serves Kunda CD block.

CD block HQ
Headquarters of Kunda CD block is at Kunda village.

References

Villages in Chatra district